The 2026 FIFA World Cup will be the 23rd FIFA World Cup, the quadrennial international men's soccer championship contested by the national teams of the member associations of FIFA. The tournament will take place from June 11 to July 19, 2026, and will be jointly hosted by 16 cities in three North American countries: Canada, Mexico, and the United States. The tournament will be the first hosted by three nations. Argentina are the defending champions.

This tournament will be the first to include 48 teams, expanded from 32. The United 2026 bid beat a rival bid by Morocco during a final vote at the 68th FIFA Congress in Moscow. It will be the first World Cup since 2002 to be hosted by more than one nation. With its past hosting of the 1970 and 1986 tournaments, Mexico will become the first country to host or co-host the men's World Cup three times. The United States last hosted the World Cup in 1994, whereas it will be Canada's first time hosting or co-hosting the men's tournament. The event will return to its traditional northern summer schedule after the 2022 edition in Qatar which was held in November and December of that year.

Format
Michel Platini, who was President of UEFA at the time, had suggested in October 2013 an expansion of the tournament to 40 teams, an idea that FIFA president Gianni Infantino also suggested in March 2016. A desire to increase the number of participants in the tournament from the previous 32 team format was announced on October 4, 2016. Four expansion options were considered:

 Expand to 40 teams (eight groups of five teams) – 88 matches
 Expand to 40 teams (ten groups of four teams) – 76 matches
 Expand to 48 teams (opening 32-team playoff round) – 80 matches
 Expand to 48 teams (16 groups of three teams) – 80 matches

On January 10, 2017, the FIFA Council chose the last of the four options and voted unanimously to expand to a 48-team tournament. Under this format, the tournament was to open with a group stage consisting of 16 groups of three teams, with the top two teams progressing from each group to a knockout tournament starting with a round of 32 teams. Under this format, the total number of games played would increase from 64 to 80, but the number of games played by finalists remained at seven, the same as with 32 teams. Each team would play one fewer group match than under the previous format, compensating for the additional knockout round. The tournament would also be completed within 32 days, the same as previous 32-team tournaments.

Response
The proposal for expanding the World Cup was opposed by the European Club Association, Liga Nacional de Fútbol Profesional (La Liga) president Javier Tebas, and former German national team coach Joachim Löw. They argued that the number of games played was already at an unacceptable level, and that expanding it would dilute the quality of the games played. They also argued that the expansion decision was taken for political reasons, as Infantino had used the promise of more countries playing in the World Cup to win his election.

In addition, an article in the Journal of Sports Analytics argued that the use of a three-team group stage with two teams progressing significantly increased the risk of collusion between teams, as seen in previous World Cup group matches, most notably in the 1982 Disgrace of Gijón. In response, FIFA's chief technical officer Marco van Basten suggested that draws may be prevented during the group stage by the use of penalty shoot-outs; while this would partially (though not entirely) mitigate the increased risk of collusion, it would introduce the possibility of a team deciding to eliminate a rival by deliberately losing a penalty shootout. Addressing the concerns related to collusion, FIFA vice-president and CONCACAF president Victor Montagliani commented in April 2022 that FIFA was still considering twelve groups of four or two sets of six groups of four, both of which would eliminate collusion entirely.

New Format
On March 14, 2023, the FIFA Council approved a revised format featuring 12 four-team groups. The reconsideration stemmed from concerns over the possibility of collusion in the last group games of three-team groups. Under the revised format, the total number of games played will increase from 64 to 104, and the number of games played by finalists will increase from seven to eight. The tournament would be completed in 39 days, an increase from 32 days of the 2014 and 2018 tournaments. Each team would still play three group matches, with the top 8 third-placed teams joining the group winners and runners-up in a new round of 32.

Host selection

The FIFA Council went back and forth between 2013 and 2017 on limitations within hosting rotation based on the continental confederations. Originally, it was set that bids to be host would not be allowed from countries belonging to confederations that hosted the two preceding tournaments. It was temporarily changed to only prohibit countries belonging to the confederation that hosted the previous World Cup from bidding to host the following tournament, before the rule was changed back to its prior state of two World Cups. However, the FIFA Council did make an exception to potentially grant eligibility to member associations of the confederation of the second-to-last host of the FIFA World Cup in the event that none of the received bids fulfill the strict technical and financial requirements. In March 2017, FIFA president Gianni Infantino confirmed that "Europe (UEFA) and Asia (AFC) are excluded from the bidding following the selection of Russia and Qatar in 2018 and 2022 respectively." Therefore, the 2026 World Cup could be hosted by one of the remaining four confederations: CONCACAF (North America; last hosted in 1994), CAF (Africa; last hosted in 2010), CONMEBOL (South America; last hosted in 2014), or OFC (Oceania, never hosted before), or potentially by UEFA in case no bid from those four met the requirements.

Co-hosting the FIFA World Cup—which had been banned by FIFA after the 2002 World Cup—was approved for the 2026 World Cup, though not limited to a specific number but instead evaluated on a case-by-case basis. Also for 2026, the FIFA general secretariat, after consultation with the Competitions Committee, had the power to exclude bidders who did not meet the minimum technical requirements to host the competition. In March 2022, Liga MX president Mikel Arriola claimed Mexico's involvement as cohost could have been at risk if the league and the federation had not responded quickly to the Querétaro–Atlas riot between rival fans that left 26 spectators injured and resulted in 14 arrests. Arriola said FIFA was "shocked" by the incident but Infantino was satisfied with the sanctions handed down against Querétaro.

Canada, Mexico, and the United States had all publicly considered bidding for the tournament separately, but the United joint bid was announced on April 10, 2017.

Voting

The voting took place on June 13, 2018, during the 68th FIFA Congress in Moscow, and it was opened to all 203 eligible members. The United bid won with 134 valid ballots, while the Morocco bid received 65 valid ballots: Iran voted for the option "None of the bids", while Cuba, Slovenia and Spain abstained from voting.

Qualification

The 2026 World Cup's qualification process has yet to be decided.

The United Bid personnel anticipated that all three host countries would be awarded automatic berths. On August 31, 2022, during a visit to Guatemala, FIFA President Gianni Infantino confirmed that six CONCACAF teams will qualify for the World Cup, with Canada, Mexico, and the United States automatically qualifying as hosts. This was officially confirmed by the FIFA Council on February 14, 2023.

CONCACAF (3)
  (co-host)
  (co-host)
  (co-host)

Slot allocation
On March 30, 2017, the Bureau of the FIFA Council (composed of the FIFA president and the presidents of each of the six confederations) proposed a slot allocation for the 2026 FIFA World Cup. The recommendation was submitted for the ratification by the FIFA Council.

On May 9, two days before the 67th FIFA Congress, the FIFA Council approved the slot allocation in a meeting in Manama, Bahrain. This includes an intercontinental playoff tournament involving six teams to decide the last two FIFA World Cup spots, making a place in intercontinental play-offs a  spot in the finals.

Notes

The ratification of slot allocation also gives the OFC a guaranteed berth in the final tournament for the first time in FIFA World Cup history: the 2026 FIFA World Cup will be the first tournament in which all six confederations have at least one guaranteed berth.

Playoff tournament
A playoff tournament involving six teams will be held to decide the final two FIFA World Cup berths: the six teams are one team in each confederation except UEFA, and one additional team from the confederation of the host countries (CONCACAF).

Two of the teams will be seeded based on the World Rankings, and they will play-off against the winners of two knockout games between the four unseeded teams for the two FIFA World Cup berths.

The four-game tournament is to be played in one or more of the host countries, and will also be used as a test event for the FIFA World Cup.

Venues 

During the bidding process, 41 cities with 43 existing, fully functional venues with regular tenants (except Montreal) and 2 venues under construction submitted to be part of the bid (3 venues in 3 cities in Mexico; 9 venues in 7 cities in Canada; 38 venues in 34 cities in the United States). A first-round elimination cut nine venues and nine cities. A second-round elimination cut an additional nine venues in six cities, while three venues in three cities (Chicago, Minneapolis, and Vancouver) dropped out due to FIFA's unwillingness to discuss financial details. After Montreal dropped out in July 2021 due to lack of provincial funding and support to renovate the Olympic Stadium, Vancouver rejoined the bid as a candidate city in April 2022, bringing the total number to 24 venues, each in its own city or metropolitan area.

On June 16, 2022, the sixteen host cities were announced by FIFA, separated into three geographical divisions: Vancouver, Seattle, San Francisco, Los Angeles, and Guadalajara (5) in the Western Division; Kansas City, Dallas, Houston, Atlanta, Monterrey, and Mexico City (6) in the Central Division; and Toronto, Boston, New York City, Philadelphia, and Miami (5) in the Eastern Division (2 in Canada, 3 in Mexico, and 11 in the United States). Eight of the sixteen chosen stadiums have permanent artificial turf surfaces that are planned to be replaced with grass under the direction of FIFA and a University of Tennessee–Michigan State University research team. Four venues (Dallas, Houston, Atlanta and Vancouver) are indoor stadiums that use retractable roof systems, and are all equipped with climate control.
Although there are soccer-specific stadiums in Canada and the United States, the largest dedicated soccer-specific stadium in the U.S., Geodis Park in Nashville, seats 30,000, which falls short of FIFA's minimum of 40,000 (Toronto's candidate venue, which is an MLS stadium, is being expanded from 30,000 to 45,500 for this tournament). However, there are some stadiums, like Mercedes-Benz Stadium in Atlanta, Gillette Stadium in Foxborough, and Lumen Field in Seattle, that are used by both NFL and MLS teams. Although primarily used for gridiron football, with the American stadiums having hosted National Football League (NFL) teams, and Canada's stadiums hosting the Canadian Football League (CFL), all of the Canadian and American stadiums have been used on numerous occasions for soccer and are also designed to host that sport.

Mexico City is the only capital of the three host nations chosen as a venue site, with Ottawa and Washington, D.C., joining Bonn (West Germany, 1974) and Tokyo (Japan, 2002) as the only capital cities not selected to host World Cup matches. Washington was a host city candidate, but combined its bid with nearby Baltimore's due to the poor state of FedEx Field, which was also unsuccessful. Other cities eliminated from the final hosting list were Cincinnati, Denver, Nashville, Orlando, and Edmonton. Ottawa's candidate venue, TD Place Stadium, was eliminated early on due to insufficient capacity. None of the stadiums used in the 1994 FIFA World Cup will be used in this tournament, and the Azteca is the only stadium being used in this tournament that was used in the 1970 and 1986 FIFA World Cups.

 A  denotes a stadium used for previous men's World Cup tournaments.
 A  denotes an indoor stadium with a fixed or retractable roof with interior climate control.

Broadcasting rights
Brazil – TV Globo, SporTV
Bulgaria – NOVA
Bosnia and Herzegovina – BHRT, MY TV
Canada – CTV, TSN, RDS
Denmark – DR, TV2
Finland – YLE, MTV
Norway – NRK, TV2
Sweden – SVT, TV4
United States – Fox, Telemundo

On February 12, 2015, FIFA renewed Fox, Telemundo, and Bell Media's broadcasting rights contract to cover 2026, without accepting any other bids. The New York Times believed that this extension was intended as compensation for the rescheduling of the 2022 World Cup to November–December rather than its traditional June–July scheduling, as it creates considerable conflicts with major professional sports leagues that are normally in their off-season during the World Cup.

References

External links

FIFA World Cup 2026, FIFA.com

 
Scheduled association football competitions
2026
2026
Soccer in the United States
2026 FIFA World Cup
2026 FIFA World Cup
2026 FIFA World Cup
2026 in the United States
2026 in Canada
2026 in Mexico